The provinces of Rwanda (Kinyarwanda: intara) are divided into districts (akarere) and municipalities (umujyi).  Prior to January 1, 2006, Rwanda was composed of 12 provinces. The Rwandan government decided to establish new provinces in an attempt to address issues that arose from the Rwandan genocide. The new provinces were to be "ethnically-diverse administrative areas". 

Until 2002, the provinces were called prefectures (perefegitura).

Provinces
As of January 1, 2006 the five provinces of Rwanda are:

Provincial districts and sectors

Eastern Province

Northern Province

Western Province

Southern Province

Kigali

Former provinces
Prior to 2006 the provinces were:

Butare Province
Byumba Province
Cyangugu Province
Gikongoro Province
Gisenyi Province
Gitarama Province
Kibungo Province
Kibuye Province
Kigali City (Established as a province in 1990)
Kigali-Rural Province (Kigali Ngali)
Ruhengeri Province
Umutara Province (Established in August 1996)

See also
 Districts of Rwanda
List provinces of Rwanda by Human Development Index
 List of Rwanda districts by population
 ISO 3166-2:RW

References

External links
 Ministry of Local Government, Community Development and Social Affairs
 Rwanda redrawn to reflect compass, BBC News, 3 January 2006

 
Subdivisions of Rwanda
Rwanda, Provinces
Rwanda 1
Provinces, Rwanda
Rwanda geography-related lists